The history of philosophy is the study of philosophical ideas and concepts through time.

History of Philosophy may also refer to:

A History of Philosophy (Copleston), book written by English Jesuit priest Frederick Charles Copleston
History of Philosophy Quarterly, American peer-reviewed academic journal
Journal of the History of Philosophy,  academic journal published by Johns Hopkins University Press